{{DISPLAYTITLE:C7H5NO}}
The molecular formula C7H5NO (molar mass: 119.12 g/mol, exact mass: 119.0371 u) may refer to:

 Anthranil (2,1-benzisoxazole)
 Benzisoxazole
 Benzoxazole
 Phenylisocyanate